Stefania Passaro (born 11 December 1963) is an Italian retired basketball player, a journalist and a certified European Financial Planner.

Born at Rapallo, she played professionally in Italy for 17 seasons, from 1978 to 1995, earning the European Cup for Women's Champion Clubs for 6 times and National Championships for 10 times.

She played 178 official games on the National Italian Team, beginning in 1980 and including 6 European Championships, one World Championship serving as captain, and the 1992 Summer Olympics in Barcelona.

References
 Article in Italian

External links

 Official website of the World Olympians Association

1963 births
Living people
People from Rapallo
Italian women's basketball players
Basketball players at the 1992 Summer Olympics
Olympic basketball players of Italy
Sportspeople from the Province of Genoa
20th-century Italian women
21st-century Italian women